Juan José Uría Bazterrica (born July 25, 1956 in Gipuzkoa) is a former Spanish handball player who competed in the 1980 Summer Olympics in the 1984 Summer Olympics, and in the 1988 Summer Olympics.

Career 
In 1980 he was part of the Spanish team which finished fifth in the Olympic tournament. He played all six matches and scored 24 goals.

Four years later he finished eighth with the Spanish team in the 1984 Olympic tournament. He played all six matches and scored ten goals.

In 1988 he was a member of the Spanish team which finished ninth in the Olympic tournament. He played all six matches and scored six goals.

References

1956 births
Living people
Spanish male handball players
Olympic handball players of Spain
Handball players at the 1980 Summer Olympics
Handball players at the 1984 Summer Olympics
Handball players at the 1988 Summer Olympics
Sportspeople from Gipuzkoa
People from Donostialdea
Handball players from the Basque Country (autonomous community)